In the Reins is a joint EP by Calexico and Iron & Wine, released by Overcoat Recordings on September 13, 2005. Iron & Wine's Sam Beam wrote all of the songs, which were recorded by the two bands together at Wavelab Studio in Tucson, Arizona. The album peaked at #135 on the Billboard 200. Both later collaborated on a cover of Bob Dylan's "Dark Eyes" for the I'm Not There soundtrack, while Calexico's Joey Burns was featured on Iron & Wine's third LP, The Shepherd's Dog.

Track listing

2006 Japanese Edition (w/ live bonus tracks)

Personnel
Sam Beam
Joey Burns
John Convertino
Salvador Duran
Nick Luca
Paul Niehaus
Ryan Roscoe
Craig Schumacher
Jacob Valenzuela
Martin Wenk
Natalie Wyatts
Volker Zander

Production
Craig Schumacher – recording, mixing
Nick Luca – engineering
Chris Schultz – engineering

References

Iron & Wine albums
Calexico (band) EPs
2005 EPs
Collaborative albums